India–Serbia relations are foreign relations between the republic of India and the republic of Serbia. India has an embassy in Belgrade. Serbia has an embassy in New Delhi and an honorary consulate in Chennai. 
Both countries are key allies and were founding members of the Non Aligned Movement with Serbia being part of Socialist Federal Republic of Yugoslavia at the time. India was one of the nations that cosponsored the proposal to readmit the Federal Republic of Yugoslavia to the United Nations in 2000. India backs Serbia's position regarding Kosovo and supports Serbia's EU integration process. During her visit to Belgrade in 2013, Indian foreign minister Preneet Kaur stated that she hopes that Serbia will continue to support reforms in international bodies, including the United Nations, and India's bid to become a permanent member of the UN Security Council. In an interview for local media, H.E. Narinder Chauhan, Indian Ambassador to Serbia stated that "Despite of Breakup of Yugoslavia our political relations continue to be exceptional, marked by a long tradition of mutual support on issues of core interest... It is a matter of immense satisfaction that Serbia also supports India’s international role. India sees Serbia as a reliable partner."

History 

In 1926 Rabindranath Tagore gave two lectures at the University of Belgrade. Countries had developed close friendly relations during the period of Cold War when both Yugoslavia and India tried to maintain the peaceful coexistence among the nations. Especially close relations existed among the Yugoslav president Josip Broz Tito and Indian first Prime Minister Pandit Jawaharlal Nehru. Since 1970's New Belgrade has two streets named after Mahatma Gandhi and Pt. Jawaharlal Nehru with the busts of the two leaders set in that place in 1990's. During 2014 Southeast Europe floods India donated 100,000 $ of humanitarian aid to Serbia. In 2016 Russian Air Force announced that during the year they will organize joint military exercise for Serbia, Russia, Belarus, Egypt and India.

Cultural relations

Serbia was one of the nations that cosponsored Narendra Modi proposal for International Yoga Day at United Nations.

See also 
 Foreign relations of India
 Foreign relations of Serbia
 India's reaction to the 2008 Kosovo declaration of independence
 India–Yugoslavia relations
 Yugoslavia and the Non-Aligned Movement

References

External links 
 Serbian embassy in New Delhi
 Indian embassy in Belgrade
 Serbian Ministry of Foreign Affairs about relations with India

 
Serbia
Bilateral relations of Serbia